War Ina Babylon is an album by Max Romeo and Lee Perry's backing band The Upsetters, released in 1976.

Along with The Heptones' Party Time and Junior Murvin's Police and Thieves, both released in 1977, this album is a part of what is referred to as Lee "Scratch" Perry-produced Black Ark "holy trinity".

Track listing
All tracks composed by Max Romeo and Lee "Scratch" Perry except where indicated.

Side A
"One Step Forward" – 5:15
"Uptown Babies" (Romeo) – 5:00
"Chase the Devil" – 3:27
"War ina Babylon" – 4:51
Side B
"Norman" – 4:50
"Stealin'" (Romeo) – 3:04
"Tan and See" (Romeo, Perry, Brown) – 4:36
"Smokey Room" (Romeo, Perry, Brown) – 3:03
"Smile Out of Style" – 3:32

Personnel
Max Romeo – lead vocals
Barry Llewellyn, Earl Morgan – male harmony vocals
Cynthia Schloss, Marcia Griffiths – female harmony vocals
Technical
Lee "Scratch" Perry – production, engineering
Tony Wright – cover artwork
Kim Gottlieb – back cover photography

Singles
1975: "One Step Forward"
1976: "War in a Babylon"
1976: "Chase the Devil"
1977: "Norman"

References

1976 albums
Island Records albums
Max Romeo albums
Albums produced by Lee "Scratch" Perry
Reggae albums by Jamaican artists